Pseudamnicola meloussensis is a species of small brackish water snails with an operculum, aquatic gastropod mollusks in the family Hydrobiidae.

Distribution 
This species occurs on the Mediterranean island of Majorca.

References 

Hydrobiidae
Gastropods described in 2007
Endemic fauna of the Balearic Islands